Sarah Victoria "Torri" Higginson (born December 6, 1969) is a Canadian actress. She is best known for her roles in the TekWar movies and series, and for portraying Dr. Elizabeth Weir in Stargate SG-1 and Stargate Atlantis (2004–2008), Dr. Jordan Hampton in NCIS (2007–2009), and Commander Delaney Truffault in Dark Matter (2015–2017). She is also a theatre actress and has appeared in Three Tall Women, Weldon Rising, and Picasso at the Lapin Agile.

Early life
Higginson was born in Burlington, Ontario and studied to become an actor at the Guildhall School of Music and Drama in London, United Kingdom.

Career
In 1995, two years prior to Stargate SG-1s premiere, Higginson starred in the movie Jungleground with three other actors from the Stargate franchise: Peter Williams (Apophis), JR Bourne (Martouf), and Lexa Doig (Dr. Lam). Higginson took over the role of Dr. Elizabeth Weir from Jessica Steen in a guest spot on the season eight opener of Stargate SG-1. She was then carried over as the leader of the Atlantis expedition on Stargate Atlantis and continued playing that role until the end of the show's third season, afterwards being reduced from a main cast member to a recurring role in the fourth season. She did not reprise the role for the show's fifth season.

In 2015, Higginson was cast in the CBC television drama series This Life as Natalie Lawson, a lifestyle columnist and single mother who is diagnosed with terminal cancer. The series ran for two seasons, and was ultimately cancelled on January 24, 2017. In 2016, she portrayed Dr. Kessler on the KindaTV web series Inhuman Condition. 

In February 2021 it was announced that Higginson, who had a recurring role on the CTV  medical series Transplant, was upgraded to a regular cast member for season 2 after the rights for the show were acquired by NBC.

Accolades
Higginson won a Gemini Award for Best Performance by an Actress in a Continuing Leading Dramatic Role for The City in 2000. In 2004, she was nominated for a Saturn Award for Best Supporting Actress on Television for her performance in Stargate Atlantis.

Filmography

Feature film

Television film

Television appearances

References

External links

 
 

Living people
Canadian television actresses
Canadian film actresses
Canadian voice actresses
People from Burlington, Ontario
Actresses from Ontario
Best Actress in a Drama Series Canadian Screen Award winners
Alumni of the Guildhall School of Music and Drama
20th-century Canadian actresses
21st-century Canadian actresses
1969 births